After five seasons in the National Association, the 1876 Philadelphia Athletics finished the first season of the National League with a record of 14–45, good for 7th place. It would prove to be their only season in the league, as they were expelled from the league as punishment for refusing to make a late-season road trip.

Regular season 
 April 22, 1876: The Athletics played in the first game in National League history, losing to the Boston Red Caps, 7–6.

Season standings

Record vs. opponents

Roster

Player stats

Batting

Starters by position 
Note: Pos = Position; G = Games played; AB = At bats; H = Hits; Avg. = Batting average; HR = Home runs; RBI = Runs batted in

Other batters 
Note: G = Games played; AB = At bats; H = Hits; Avg. = Batting average; HR = Home runs; Runs batted in

Pitching

Starting pitchers 
Note: G = Games pitched; IP = Innings pitched; W = Wins; L = Losses; ERA = Earned run average; SO = Strikeouts

Relief pitchers 
Note: G = Games pitched; W = Wins; L = Losses; SV = Saves; ERA = Earned run average; SO = Strikeouts

Notes

References
 1876 Philadelphia Athletics team page at Baseball Reference

Philadelphia Athletics (1860–1876) seasons
Philadelphia Athletics season